Acacia varia is a shrub of the genus Acacia and the subgenus Pulchellae that is endemism to an area of south western Australia.

Description
The shrub typically grows to a height of  blooms in from May to October producing cream-white flowers.

Varieties
There are three varieties:
 Acacia varia var. crassinervis
 Acacia varia var. parviflora
 Acacia varia var. varia

Distribution
It is native to an area in the South West, Goldfields-Esperance and Great Southern regions of Western Australia where it is commonly situated on hills, rises and ridges growing in sandy, loamy or clay loam soils that can contain lateritic gravel.

See also
List of Acacia species

References

varia
Acacias of Western Australia
Taxa named by Bruce Maslin
Plants described in 1975